Riverside is the name of several places in the U.S. state of New York:

 Riverside, Buffalo, a neighborhood in Buffalo, New York
 Riverside, Steuben County, New York, a village
 Riverside, Suffolk County, New York, a hamlet and census-designated place
 Riverside, a hamlet in the Town of Unadilla, New York

See also
Riverside (house), a mansion on the Upper West Side of New York City
Riverside Drive, a scenic north-south road on the Upper West Side of New York City
Riverside (disambiguation)